Darwin Eduardo Pérez Curiñanco (born 8 May 1977) is a Chilean former professional footballer who played as a right wing-back for clubs in Chile and Indonesia.

Club career
A product of Deportes Concepción youth system, he made his professional debut in the 1994 Segunda División, winning the league title and getting the promotion to the top division. He was with the club until 2000, when he was loaned to Universidad de Concepción until the end of his contract, due to disagreement with the coach, Oscar Garré.

The next season, he returned to Deportes Concepción, taking part in the 2001 Copa Libertadores. In his homeland, he also played for Rangers de Talca and Deportes Puerto Montt in the top division and for Fernández Vial in the second division.

Abroad, he played in Indonesia for PSM Makassar and PSIS Semarang between 2003 and 2004.

His last club was Deportes Concepción from 2007 to 2009.

International career
Pérez represented Chile in the 2002 FIFA World Cup qualifier against Ecuador on 14 November 2001. Previously, he represented Chile at both under-20 and under-23 levels.

Personal life
Pérez is of Mapuche descent and his maternal surname, Curiñanco, means "black condor" in Mapudungun.

Honours
Deportes Concepción
 Segunda División de Chile: 1994

References

External links
 
 
 Darwin Pérez at FootballDatabese.eu 
 Darwin Pérez at PartidosdeLaRoja.com 

1977 births
Living people
Sportspeople from Concepción, Chile
Chilean people of Mapuche descent
Chilean footballers
Chilean expatriate footballers
Chile international footballers
Chile under-20 international footballers
Deportes Concepción (Chile) footballers
Universidad de Concepción footballers
Rangers de Talca footballers
PSM Makassar players
PSIS Semarang players
Puerto Montt footballers
C.D. Arturo Fernández Vial footballers
Primera B de Chile players
Chilean Primera División players
Indonesian Premier Division players
Association football defenders
Chilean expatriate sportspeople in Indonesia
Expatriate footballers in Indonesia
Mapuche sportspeople
Indigenous sportspeople of the Americas